Seaquarium Beach (also called Sea Aquarium Beach) is a beach on the Caribbean island of Curaçao, located to the south of Willemstad. The beach is named after Curaçao Sea Aquarium, located nearby. The beach is open to the public, but an access fee must be paid. There are several bars, clubs and restaurants.

Radio station  is located on Seaquarium Beach.

References

Curaçao Travel Guide — Beaches, New York Times

Beaches of Curaçao